Southwell may refer to: 

Southwell (surname)
Southwell, assumed name of Nathaniel Bacon (Jesuit)
Southwell, Dorset, a village
Southwell, Nottinghamshire, a town
Southwell Minster, historic cathedral
Prebends of Southwell
Southwell Racecourse, horse racing venue located near Newark-on-Trent, Nottinghamshire
Southwell Rural District, a rural district in Nottinghamshire, England from 1894 to 1974
 Viscount Southwell,  a title in the Peerage of Ireland
Southwell School, a co-educational independent preparatory school in Hamilton, New Zealand
 Southwell, Eastern Cape, a settlement in South Africa